James Irvine Tattersall (27 March 1940 – 4 February 1997) was a British professional tennis player who became active from mid-1950s to early-1960s.

Career 
Tattersall defeated Ivo Ribeiro of Brazil in the boys' singles final at the Wimbledon Championships in 1957 in straight sets. He also won the boys' doubles and became the youngest British No. 1 in junior tennis. In the same year, he was a member of the Duffield Lawn Tennis Club first tennis team. During the previous year, 1956 and as a 16 year–old, Tattersall also won the boys' doubles as well as the junior mixed doubles titles at Wimbledon.

Apart from Wimbledon, Tattersall also participated at the 1960 US Open, where he was defeated by Roy Emerson in the first round 6–2, 6–0. In 1961, he participated at the U.S. Clay Court Championships and after he defeated Andy Paton, Jr. in the first round, he was defeated by the eventual champion, Barry MacKay in the second round. Tattersall announced his retirement from tennis in 1962.

Death 
He died on 4 February 1997, aged 57 at his home in Evesham, Worcestershire where he lived for the latter part of his life.

Junior Grand Slam finals

Singles: 1

References

External links 
 

1940 births
1997 deaths
English male tennis players
Tennis people from Gloucestershire
Wimbledon junior champions
British male tennis players
Grand Slam (tennis) champions in boys' singles